Jacob Johnson (November 1, 1847 – August 15, 1925) was a U.S. Representative from Utah.

Johnson was born in Aalborg, Denmark, but he emigrated to the United States in 1854. After living in both Utah and California, he studied law in Nevada. Returning to Utah, in 1872 he became a resident of Spring City in Sanpete County, where he was admitted to the bar in 1877. In 1880 he became a United States District Attorney, a position he held until 1888. He then served as Sanpete County's probate judge until 1890. During 1892–1894 he was prosecuting attorney in Sanpete County, overlapping an 1893–1895 term in the Utah Territorial Legislature. In 1896 Johnson became a state court judge in Utah's Seventh Judicial District. His judicial duties took him traveling throughout southeastern Utah until 1905.

Active in Republican Party politics, Johnson was a delegate to the Republican National Convention in 1912. That year Utah had just been granted its second congressional seat. Incumbent Joseph Howell was re-elected, and Johnson was elected as Utah's new representative to the 63rd United States Congress. He served one term in Congress, failing to win the nomination in 1914.

Johnson retired from politics to continue his law practice in Salt Lake City, where he died in 1925.

The Jacob Johnson house and barn still stand in Spring City. Due to their historic and architectural significance, they are included in the Spring City Historic District, listed in the National Register of Historic Places. The owners received a 2009 Heritage Award from the Utah Heritage Foundation for restoring the property.

References

External links

 
 

1847 births
1925 deaths
Danish emigrants to the United States
Members of the Utah Territorial Legislature
19th-century American politicians
People from Sanpete County, Utah
United States Attorneys for the District of Utah
Utah state court judges
Politicians from Aalborg
Republican Party members of the United States House of Representatives from Utah